Corrado Nastasio (born 3 January 1946) is an Italian former professional footballer who played as a striker.

Career
Born in Livorno, Nastasio played for Rosignano Solvay, Reggiana, Livorno, Atalanta, Cagliari, Modena, Lucchese, Novara, Lecce and Brindisi. He retired from football at the age of 31 following his son's illness.

Later life
After retiring, Nastasio became worked in the Italian lower leagues before becoming a dockworker. He continued to support hometown club Livorno, and in October 2012 was the only Livorno fan who travelled for a match against Reggina.

References

1946 births
Living people
Italian footballers
Association football forwards
Serie A players
Serie B players
A.C. Reggiana 1919 players
U.S. Livorno 1915 players
Atalanta B.C. players
Cagliari Calcio players
Modena F.C. players
Novara F.C. players
U.S. Lecce players
Sportspeople from Livorno
Footballers from Tuscany